Two ships of the Royal Norwegian Navy have borne the name HNoMS Troll, after the Norse mythological creature Troll:

  was a  launched in 1910 and scrapped in 1949.
  was an ex-Canadian  loaned to the Royal Norwegian Navy in 1956 and bought in 1959.

Royal Norwegian Navy ship names